Just a life – the story of Fridtjof Nansen is a 1968 Norwegian/Soviet drama film directed by Sergei Mikaelyan, starring Knut Wigert and Veslemøy Haslund. The film depicts three important episodes in the life of Fridtjof Nansen (Wigert): his North Pole expedition, his diplomatic work with the League of Nations and his humanitarian work during the 1930s famine in Ukraine.

External links
 
 Bare et liv – Historien om Fridtjof Nansen at Filmweb.no (Norwegian)

1968 drama films
1968 films
Soviet drama films
Films directed by Sergei Mikaelyan
Norwegian drama films
1960s Norwegian-language films